Conasprella agassizi is a species of sea snail, a marine gastropod mollusk in the family Conidae, the cone snails and their allies.

Like all species within the genus Conasprella, these snails are predatory and venomous. They are capable of "stinging" humans, therefore live ones should be handled carefully or not at all.

Distribution
This marine species occurs in the Caribbean Sea off St. Croix Island at a depth of 214 m; also off Bermuda.

Description
The maximum recorded shell length is 24 mm.

References

External links
 Dall W.H. (1886). Reports on the results of dredging, under the supervision of Alexander Agassiz, in the Gulf of Mexico (1877-78) and in the Caribbean Sea (1879-80), by the U.S. Coast Survey steamer "Blake", Lieut.-Commander C.D. Sigsbee, U.S.N. and Commander J.R. Bartlett, U.S.N. commanding. XXIX. Report on the Mollusca. Part 1, Brachiopoda and Pelecypoda. Bulletin of the Museum of Comparative Zoölogy at Harvard College. 12(6): 171-318, pls 1-9
  Puillandre N., Duda T.F., Meyer C., Olivera B.M. & Bouchet P. (2015). One, four or 100 genera? A new classification of the cone snails. Journal of Molluscan Studies. 81: 1-23

agassizi
Gastropods described in 1886